was an 8th degree Grand Master in Shotokan karate. Born in Japan in 1943, Master Tabata started karate at age 13 and received the rank of nidan in Shorinji as a freshman in high school. Master Tabata went to Waseda University and started studying Shotokan style karate under Master Isao Obata, one of Master Gichin Funakoshi's first students and first chairman of the Japan Karate Association. He founded the North American Karate-Do Federation (NAKF) and the New England Collegiate Karate Conference (NECKC), and lived in Massachusetts in the United States where he taught regularly until his death in 2020.

Competitive History 
Master Tabata was the captain of the karate club at Waseda University, and, after moving to the United States at the behest of his sensei to spread Shotokan Karate, he was the captain of the US Karate Team for two decades, representing the US in many international tournaments. In addition, he was the technical director for the US National Olympic Committee.

North American Karate-do Federation 
The North American Karate-do Federation is a collection of Shotokan karate schools, mostly in New England and centered in Greater Boston. The organization was founded in 1968 by Master Tabata at the urging of his teacher Master Isao Obata. Its sister organisation is the NECKC, and together they host a bi-annual tournament.

Current members
Haverhill [Youth Empower House], under Sensei Robert Harb - Haverhill, Massachusetts.
Triumph Martial Arts, under Sensei Mark Ryder - Concord, Massachusetts.
Lunenburg School, under Sensei George Noone - Lunenburg, Massachusetts.
Tiger Mountain Shotokan Karate, under Sensei Gayle Fleming - New London, New Hampshire.
Wyoming Valley Karate Club, under Sensei James Ambrose - Plains Township, Pennsylvania.

The New England Collegiate Karate Conference
The New England Collegiate Karate Conference is a group of colleges and universities in the New England area, centered in Boston, that was founded by, and train under, Tabata. It is a sister organization of the NAKF. Current members are listed below and past members have also included Yale University and University of Massachusetts Amherst.

Current members
Boston College
Boston University
Massachusetts Institute of Technology
Tufts University
University of Massachusetts Lowell
Wellesley University

Bibliography

References

External links
 Official Page of the NAKF
 Monster Tabata
 MIT Shotokan Club
 The Battle for Boston biannual martial arts tournament
 Videos of the Shotokan Kata up to Blue Belt performed by Kazumi Tabata (released under Creative Commons)
 Power Karate: Basic Karate Techniques for Colleges (Amazon.com)
 Secret Tactics: Lessons from the Great Masters of Martial Arts (Amazon.com)
 Mind Power: Secret Strategies for the Martial Arts (Amazon.com)
 Kazumi Tabata memorial website

Shotokan practitioners
1943 births
Living people
Japanese emigrants to the United States
Japanese male karateka
American male karateka